Mizzah was a chief/duke of Edom.

Mizzah was the son of Reuel, who was the son of Esau.

References: Genesis 36:13, 17; I Chronicles 1:37.
Meanings:  "strong," "firm"

External links
https://www.studylight.org/encyclopedias/isb/m/mizzah.html

Edom
Book of Genesis people